

Angiosperms

Molluscs

Archosaurmopha

Dinosaurs
Data courtesy of George Olshevsky's dinosaur genera list.

Birds

Popular culture

Literature
 Pataud, le petit dinosaure was published. This was the first book about dinosaurs intended for an audience of children young enough to be new to reading. Paleontologist William A. S. Sarjeant has called it a "charmin[g]" book and "remarkable" that the earliest dinosaur book aimed at children was French since "French children do not share North American children's fascination" with dinosaurs.

References

1960s in paleontology
Paleontology
Paleontology 0